Holub (feminine Holubová) is a Czech, Slovak, Ukrainian, and Belarusian surname. It means pigeon or dove. It is a cognate of Gołąb and Golub.

It may refer to:

 Beata Holub, Polish high jumper
 Emil Holub, Czech doctor, explorer, cartographer, and ethnographer in Africa
 E. J. Holub, AFL and NFL player
 Eva Holubová, a Czech actress
 Jan Holub (disambiguation), multiple people
 Josef Ludwig Holub, botanist
 Małgorzata Hołub-Kowalik (born 1992), Polish sprinter
 Miloslava Holubová, Czech tennis player
 Miroslav Holub, Czech poet and immunologist
 Petra Holubová, Czech tennis player
 Radim Holub, Czech footballer
 Renate Holub, political philosopher and social theorist
 Robert C. Holub, 28th chancellor of the University of Massachusetts Amherst
 Vicki Hollub, American businesswoman, CEO of Occidental Petroleum

See also
 
 Holubek, Holoubek (disambiguation) (diminutive form)
 Holubec
 Golub (other Slavic form)
 Golubev (Russian form)
 Golomb (other Slavic form)
 Galamb (Hungarian form)
 Hrdlička

Czech words and phrases
Czech-language surnames